“All Come Together” is a song by Australian rock musician, Johnny Diesel. The song was released as the first single from his third studio album Solid State Rhyme. The song peaked at number 17 in Australia.
A percentage of the sales of the single was donated to World Vision.

Track listing
CD single (8740602)
 "All Come Together" (4:09)
 "P&H Children" (3:45)

 CD Maxi
 "All Come Together" (4:09)
 "P&H Children" (3:45)
 "Get Lucky" (Live Version)	
 "One More Time" (Acoustic)

Charts
“All Come Together” debuted at #24 in Australia before peaking at #17 in November 1994.

Weekly charts

Credits
 Backing Vocals – Venetta Fields
 Congas [Congos] – Rick Kugler
 Drums, Percussion – Kane Baker 
 Piano, Organ [Hammond B3] – Rob Woolf

References

External links

EMI Records singles
1994 singles
1994 songs
Diesel (musician) songs
Songs written by Diesel (musician)